Brussels is a town in Door County, Wisconsin, United States. The population was 1,136 at the 2010 census. The unincorporated communities of Brussels and Kolberg are located in the town. The unincorporated community of Rosiere is also located partially in the town.

History
Brussels, a civil town in Door County, was created on November 12, 1858.

The largest Belgian-American settlement in the United States is located in portions of Brown, Kewaunee, and Door counties in Wisconsin, adjacent to the waters of Green Bay. Walloons settled the region in the 1850s and their descendants still constitute a high proportion of the population. A variety of elements attests to the Belgian-American presence: place names (Brussels, Namur, Rosiere, Luxemburg), the Walloon language, surnames, foods (booyah, trippe, and jutt), the Kermis harvest festival, and especially architecture. Many of the original wooden structures of the Belgian Americans were destroyed in a firestorm that swept across southern Door County in October 1871. A few stone houses made of local dolomite survived. More common are 1880s red brick houses, distinguished by modest size and gable-end, bull's-eye windows. Some houses have detached summer kitchens with bake ovens appended to the rear. And the Belgians, many of them devout Catholics, also erected small roadside votive chapels like those in their homeland.

Most Belgian-American towns 
Brussels, Wisconsin is the third-most Belgian-American community in the United States, by proportion of residents.

 Union, Door County, Wisconsin: 49%
 Red River, Wisconsin (Kewaunee County): 47%
 Brussels, Wisconsin (Door County): 36.4% (composed of "Brussels community" & "Namur Community")
 Lincoln, Kewaunee County, Wisconsin: 35.4%
 Green Bay (town), Wisconsin (Brown County): 31.8%

Geography

According to the United States Census Bureau, the town has a total area of 36.2 square miles (93.6 km2), all of it land.

Brussels Hill 

The 102 ft high Brussels Hill (elevation 851 feet) is the highest point in the county. It has been explained as the result of a meteorite impact. The hill is missing blocks of rock ripped off during glaciation. The broken rocks leave behind nearly horizontal and vertical rock surfaces along the pre-existing weaknesses (beds and joints) in the rock. This is considered a feature of glaciokarst geology.

Demographics

2000 
As of the census of 2000, there were 1,112 people, 403 households, and 303 families residing in the town. The population density was 30.8 people per square mile (11.9/km2). There were 428 housing units at an average density of 11.8 per square mile (4.6/km2). The racial makeup of the town was 97.93% White, 0.18% African American, 0.72% Native American, 0.81% Asian, 0.09% from other races, and 0.27% from two or more races. Hispanic or Latino of any race were 0.45% of the population.

There were 403 households, out of which 37.0% had children under the age of 18 living with them, 66.0% were married couples living together, 4.5% had a female householder with no husband present, and 24.8% were non-families. 19.6% of all households were made up of individuals, and 10.2% had someone living alone who was 65 years of age or older. The average household size was 2.76 and the average family size was 3.19.

In the town, the population was spread out, with 27.4% under the age of 18, 7.5% from 18 to 24, 30.8% from 25 to 44, 24.1% from 45 to 64, and 10.2% who were 65 years of age or older. The median age was 36 years. For every 100 females age 18 and over, there were 101.8 males.

The median income for a household in the town was $42,212, and the median income for a family was $45,341. Males had a median income of $30,000 versus $21,678 for females. The per capita income for the town was $16,871. About 4.3% of families and 6.5% of the population were below the poverty line, including 8.6% of those under age 18 and 9.9% of those age 65 or over.

2010 
The census of 2010 revealed there were 1,136 people, 430 households, and 330 families residing within the town.

Notable people 

 Erik Cordier, MLB player
 Jim Flanigan, NFL player
 Al Johnson, NFL player
 Ben Johnson, NFL player

References

External links 
 Belgian-American Research Collection of the University of Wisconsin–Madison

Towns in Door County, Wisconsin
Belgian-American culture in Wisconsin
Populated places established in 1858
1858 establishments in Wisconsin
Towns in Wisconsin